Edvard Valenta (22 January 1901 in Prostějov – 21 August 1978 in Prague) was a Czech journalist and writer.

Life
Valenta was born into a family of a medical doctor. After secondary school (finished in 1918) he started to study at a technical university but left soon for the work of journalist. In 1920 Valenta joined the Brno office of the newspaper Lidové noviny and stayed here until February 1948 when he was purged away by the new communist regime. In December 1948 Valenta was taken into custody and in July 1949 given a short sentence. Although imprisoned for relatively short time his health has deteriorated. Valenta was allowed to publish again during period of cultural liberalisation.

Among his most important works are recordings of adventures of Jan Welzl (together with colleague Bedřich Golombek), biography of African explorer Emil Holub and psychological novel Jdi za zeleným světlem. The novel depicts life of an intellectual who, affected by tragic events, decides to start a new life in a small quiet village, in distance from the civilisation. The cruelty of World War II occupation graduates and at the end the main character of the novel is shot by retreating German soldiers.

Selected works
 Valenta had recorded stories of Jan Welzl and they were published in four books during the 1930s.
 Lidé, které jsem potkal cestou, 1939.
 Druhé housle, 1943. Biography of Emil Holub.
 Kouty srdce a světa, 1946.
 Kvas, 1947.
 Světem pro nic za nic, 1947. Book of travels in Americas.
 Poprvé a naposledy, 1948.
 Jdi za zeleným světlem, 1956. A psychological portrait of an intellectual during occupation.
 Nejkrásnější země, 1958.
 Trám, 1963.
 Dlouhán v okně, 1965.
 Život samé psaní, 1970.
 Žil jsem s miliardářem, 1979. Remembrance on industrialist Jan Antonín Baťa.
 Žít ještě jednou, 1983. A detective novel.

External links 
 Short biography (in Czech)
 Overview of the novel Jdi za zeleným světlem (in Czech)

1901 births
1971 deaths
Czech journalists
Czech poets
Czech male poets
20th-century Czech poets
20th-century male writers
Writers from Prostějov
20th-century journalists